The Río Segura is the flagship patrol boat of the Maritime Service of the Spanish Civil Guard. It is named after the Segura river in southeastern Spain.

References

Patrol vessels of Spain
2011 ships
Law enforcement in Spain